Roberto Volpato Neto or simply Roberto  (born July 1, 1979 in Orleans), is a Brazilian goalkeeper who plays for Criciúma.

External links
 crvascodagama.com
 zerozero.pt
 CBF
 sambafoot
 netvasco.com.br

1979 births
Living people
Brazilian footballers
Association football goalkeepers
Campeonato Brasileiro Série A players
Campeonato Brasileiro Série B players
CR Vasco da Gama players
Criciúma Esporte Clube players
Vitória F.C. players
America Football Club (RJ) players
Moreirense F.C. players
Associação Atlética Ponte Preta players
Esporte Clube XV de Novembro (Piracicaba) players